The Sustainable Energy Act 2003 (c 30) is an Act of the Parliament of the United Kingdom.

The white paper "Our energy future – creating a low carbon economy" (Cm 5761), published in February 2003, is a precursor of this Act.

Section 9 - Citation, extent and commencement
The following orders have been made under this section:
The Sustainable Energy Act 2003 (Commencement No. 1) Order 2003 (S.I. 2003/2986 (C. 110))
The Sustainable Energy Act 2003 (Commencement No. 2) Order 2004 (S.I. 2004/1203 (C. 51))

References
Halsbury's Statutes,

External links
The Sustainable Energy Act 2003, as amended from the National Archives.
The Sustainable Energy Act 2003, as originally enacted from the National Archives.
Explanatory notes to the Sustainable Energy Act 2003.

United Kingdom Acts of Parliament 2003